Nick McLean, Sr., (born 29 May 1941), full name George Nicholas McLean, is an American cinematographer, best known for his work on the television shows Friends, Joey, Cybill, and Evening Shade.

Early life and education 

McLean was born in Santa Monica, California, the son of George McLean and Dorothy Jane (née Scott), and raised in the San Fernando Valley. He attended North Hollywood High School. His family was highly involved in the entertainment industry. His uncle was an actor and his step-father, Fred Jackman, Jr., son of the second president of the ASC, was a cinematographer. McLean attended USC on a football scholarship.  He then opened a pool hall and a body and fender shop in Van Nuys, California.

Career
McLean's step-father introduced him to the camera department at Columbia Pictures. McLean got his first job in 1966 as a clapper boy on a television series called The Iron Horse. He worked ten days during the first year and one day the next year.

In 1969 McLean became a second assistant cameraman at Universal Studios, working on many shows.  The first feature film that he worked on was Red Sky at Morning with Vilmos Zsigmond, who promoted McLean to operator. He did all the aerials on his films, and also on some commercials even after he became a cinematographer. McLean's first movie as a cinematographer was Stroker Ace. Burt Reynolds then asked McLean to shoot Evening Shade, which became a highly popular sitcom.

McLean continued to work on various film and television projects, as camera operator, cinematographer and director of photography.

In 2002 McLean received an Emmy nomination for Outstanding Cinematography in a Multicamera Series for his work on Friends.

Family 

McLean has an older brother, Steve McLean, who is a camera operator; a sister, Linda, who has done various acting work; a son, Nicholas S. McLean, who is a camera assistant; and a daughter, Shay McLean, who is a singer, songwriter, and actress. His wife, Karen, is an animal wrangler for films, television shows and commercials. He also has one granddaughter and two grandsons.

Filmography

Film
 1979: Cheech & Chong's Next Movie
 1982: Stroker Ace
 1983: Staying Alive
 1983: Cannonball Run II
 1983: Stick
 1984: City Heat
 1984: Twice in a Lifetime
 1985: Gung Ho/Working Class Man
 1985: The Goonies
 1986: Cobra
 1986: Short Circuit
 1986: Heat (second unit)
 1986: Spaceballs
 1987: Mac and Me
 1993: My Father, the Hero (replaced Francis Veber)
 1994: The Maddening
 1999: The Last Producer/The Final Hit

Television 

 1988: The Pretenders
 1989: B-Men
 1988-89: B.L. Stryker
 1990-93: Evening Shade
 1991: Maverick Square
 1992: Hearts Afire
 1993: The Man from Left Field
 1993: Harlan & Merleen
 1994-97: Cybill
 1995: The Home Court
 1998-99: Veronica's Closet
 1999: Friends
 2000-03: Friends
 2002: Life with Bonnie
 2004: Listen Up
 2004: Life on a Stick
 2005: Hot Properties
 2005: Joey
 2006: 'til Death

Films as camera assistant/operator 

 1966: The Iron Horse
 1970: Red Sky at Morning
 1970: The Touch of Satan/Curse of Melissa/Night of the Demon
 1972: Domo Arigato/Thank You Very Much
 1973: The Sugerland Express
 1973: Cinderella Liberty
 1973: Larry
 1974: Funny Lady
 1975: Obsession
 1975: Sweet Revenge/Dandy, the All American Girl
 1975: Marathon Man 
 1976: Exorcist II: The Heretic
 1976: Close Encounters of the Third Kind
 1976: Looking for Mr. Goodbar
 1977: The Deer Hunter
 1977: Heaven Can Wait
 1978: The Rose
 1979: Being There/Chance
 1979: Cheech and Chong's Next Movie/High Encounters (of the Ultimate Kind)
 1980: Honky Tonk Freeway
 1980: Rich and Famous
 1981: Sharky's Machine
 1981: The Best Little Whorehouse in Texas
 1982: Kiss Me Goodbye

Television as director 

 1989: B.L. Stryker

Miscellaneous 

 1991: Burt Reynolds' Conversations with...

References

External links
http://www.cinematographers.nl/PaginasDoPh/mclean.htm

http://motion.kodak.com/motion/uploadedFiles/joey.pdf

1941 births
Living people
American cinematographers
North Hollywood High School alumni
People from Santa Monica, California